SS15 LRT station is a Light Rapid Transit station connects the SS15 and SS17 neighborhoods in Subang Jaya, Selangor.  The station is located at Jalan Jengka.

It is operated under the Kelana Jaya LRT system network as found in the station signage. Like most other LRT stations operating in Klang Valley, this station is elevated.

Bus Services

Feeder buses

Other buses

Gallery

Around the station

SS15 Courtyard
Pasar Besar SS15 Subang Jaya
INTI College Subang
SS15 Bubble Tea Street

External links 

SS15 LRT Station

Kelana Jaya Line
Railway stations opened in 2016